Evelina G. Fedorenko (born 1980) is a Russian-born American cognitive neuroscientist.

Early life and education 
Born in 1980 in Volgograd in the Soviet Union, Fedorenko moved to the United States in 1998. In 2002, she graduated from Harvard University with a bachelor's degree in psychology and linguistics. She then went to Massachusetts Institute of Technology (MIT) for her graduate degree in cognitive science and neuroscience, receiving her Ph.D in 2007.

Career and research
, Fedorenko is an associate professor and laboratory head in the Brain and Cognitive Sciences department at MIT, and an associate member of MIT's McGovern Institute for Brain Research, as well as an associate researcher at Massachusetts General Hospital. She was an assistant professor at Harvard Medical School (2014–2019).

Her specialty is the human language system. Her goal is to try to provide a representation of our brain regions and to study individuals who have healthy brain regions and who have brain disorders. She is also trying to understand the calculations that we perform in our everyday life. During her research she uses different kinds of methods including functional magnetic resonance imaging (fMRI), ERPs and intracranial recordings. One of her areas of research is the brains of polyglots, who speak multiple languages. This research has been featured in The New Yorker magazine and the BBC World Service documentary, The Polyglots.

Awards
In 2007, she received the Pathway to Independence Award (K99/R00 career development award) from Eunice Kennedy Shriver National Institute of Child Health and Human Development (NICHD).

Personal life
She is married to Ted Gibson, a cognitive scientist.

References

External links

Ev Fedorenko's Language Lab

Living people
American women neuroscientists
American neuroscientists
Cognitive neuroscientists
Russian emigrants to the United States
1980 births
Date of birth missing (living people)
Massachusetts Institute of Technology School of Science alumni
Harvard College alumni
Massachusetts Institute of Technology School of Science faculty
21st-century American women